Lyndon School is a co-educational secondary school in Solihull, West Midlands, England. It is situated near to the Birmingham boundary and draws pupils from both Solihull and Birmingham. The school regularly houses half term sports clubs. It also held a specialist Humanities College status between 2006 and 2010 when the Specialist Schools Programme ended. The school converted to academy status in September 2015.

Notable alumni
Al Hunter Ashton, English actor and script-writer
Matthew Croucher, member of the Royal Marines Reserve and a recipient of the George Cross
Mitch Hancox, English professional footballer
Shaun Timmins, English footballer

Notable staff
Barbara Hambly (field hockey)

External links

Secondary schools in Solihull
Academies in Solihull